The Heckler & Koch MK 23, MK 23 MOD 0, Mark 23, or USSOCOM MARK 23 is a semi-automatic large-frame pistol chambered in .45 ACP, designed specifically to be an offensive pistol. The USSOCOM version of the MK23 came paired with a laser aiming module (LAM) and suppressor. The USSOCOM MK23 was adopted by the United States Special Operations Command (USSOCOM) for special operations units, beating out the nearest competitor, Colt's OHWS. Development of the pistol began in 1991 as special operations representatives identified the need for an "Offensive Handgun Weapons System—Special Operations Peculiar", and delivery of the pistols began in May 1996 to the special operation units.

While the USSOCOM MK23 designation usually applies to the complete system, it is also commonly used in reference to the pistol component alone. The LAM and suppressor were developed by Insight Technology and Knight's Armament Company (KAC), respectively. The civilian version of the Mk23 sold by itself is designated the Mark 23.

Overview
The MK 23 is designed for exceptional durability in harsh environments, being waterproof and corrosion-resistant. It uses a polygonal barrel design, which is reported to improve accuracy and durability, and is much more expensive to produce. It also features an ambidextrous safety and magazine release on both sides of the frame. The magazine release is at the rear edge of the trigger guard, which is wide enough to allow the use of gloves. A decocking lever is on the left side, which will silently lower the cocked hammer. The MK 23 is part of a larger weapon system that includes an attachable Laser Aiming Module (LAM), a suppressor, and some other features such as a special high-pressure match cartridge (.45 +P ammunition).

The firearm was tested and found to be capable of firing tens of thousands of rounds without a barrel change. It remains reliable in harsh conditions, making it suitable for use by special forces. The .45 ACP round is subsonic in the standard loading, making it suitable for use with a suppressor.

Development
In 1989, US SOCOM began reviewing their equipment to see which gear fit the needs of their special close quarters battle role.  Studying small arms revealed that there were 120 types and configurations of infantry weapons in different units.  The logistics of getting spare parts for all these weapons was overwhelming.  In response, SOCOM decided to standardize small arms among all units.  One area of improvement was the pistol, undertaken by the Offensive Handgun Weapon System (OHWS) competition.  It would replace pistols like the 9 mm M9, which was used by regular troops as a secondary weapon.  SOCOM's use of small units that operate in close means that pistols are more likely to be used as primary weapons.

The caliber for the OHWS was quickly decided not to be the NATO standard  9 mm due to lack of stopping power.  The FBI had selected the 10 mm auto to replace their 9 mm pistols, but it was too powerful, few manufacturers produced it, and the round caused short weapon service life.  The .45 ACP caliber was chosen and improved upon with the high velocity, high pressure  +P loading.

The OHWS pistol had to fire many types of rounds in addition to the +P cartridge and have a long service life with the high pressure ammo.  The M1911 had been proven in service for over 70 years, but was rejected.  High pressure rounds would destroy it and it did not fire reliably with a suppressor.  Upgrading the M1911 would cost more than it was worth, so it was decided that they would select an entirely new design.  A request for quote was for a system that included a pistol, suppressor, and laser aiming module.  The pistol had to be corrosion resistant, have a high mean rounds between failures (MRBF), and be able to serve as a primary weapon.

After several tests, Heckler & Koch and Colt submissions were selected to move to phase I of the OHWS program in August 1991. They were awarded developmental contracts to produce 30 systems. At the time the program was beginning, HK was studying what aspects were most desirable in handguns for the U.S. civilian market.  They came up with a design that had these features including reliability, durability, affordability, and others by February 1991.  Colt however essentially drew upon existing technologies for their submission called the Colt OHWS.  They used an M1911 frame that could accept a 10-round magazine, the decocking mechanism from the Colt Double Eagle, and the rotating barrel locking system from the All American 2000.  The barrel of the Colt OHWS could not directly attach a suppressor, so a mounting was added to a rail in front of the handguard.

Colt was eliminated after phase I, leaving only HK to move on to phase II. This phase subjected the pistols to the strictest reliability testing any pistol ever went through. The requirement was for no less than 2,000 MRBF; the HK OHWS averaged 6,027 MRBF and could reach 15,122 MRBF. The weapons worked in temperatures from -25 degrees Fahrenheit to 140 degrees Fahrenheit while exposed to mud, ice, and sand. Phase III was the awarding of a production contract to HK in June 1995. Their pistol was type classified as the Mark 23 Mod 0, and 1,950 systems were ordered at $1,186 each. All pistols were produced in Germany and the first was delivered to SOCOM on 1 May 1996.

Even though the Mark 23 had performed admirably, several factors worked against its use.  Previous operators were trained to fire multiple 9 mm rounds and they thought firing extra rounds made up for not using harder hitting but larger and heavier .45 ACP rounds.  The introduction of the smaller and lighter HK USP, political pressures, and shortages of +P ammunition also contributed against the pistol.  As the War on Terror went on, operators saw the effectiveness of the .45 ACP in combat and renewed use of the Mark 23, as well as other pistols chambered for the round.

Adoption
The MK 23 MOD 0 was built as an "offensive" handgun for U.S. special operations forces under USSOCOM, per request made in 1989. Military versions of the firearm have the writing "MK23 USSOCOM" engraved on the slide. The first MK 23 production models were delivered to SOCOM on May 1, 1996.

HK commercially markets the MK 23 and derivatives of it, but not the complete SOCOM system. The suppressor is made by Knight's Armament Company, and was selected over the one HK originally included as part of its entry. Insight Technology won the contract to produce the laser aiming module, later designated AN/PEQ-6. One version of the LAM produces a visible light dot, while another produces an infrared dot that can only be seen through night vision goggles. There have since been different LAM models and, at least commercially, different suppressors as well. It has been reported by some users that the cumulative effects of recoil may occasionally cause the can of the suppressor to become slightly unscrewed, but that it is relatively easy to improvise solutions for the problem.

Civilian Mark 23
Heckler & Koch has offered the MK 23 on the civilian market and law enforcement as the MARK 23. It is distributed by its subsidiaries HK Inc. (United States) and HKJS GmbH (Germany).

The models for the U.S. market initially came with a 10-round magazine, to comply with the U.S. Assault Weapons Ban. The ban has now expired, and the civilian Mark 23 comes with the same 12-round magazine as the government variants, except in a few states that enforce their own bans on magazines larger than 10 rounds. In Canada, the Mark 23 pistol is still supplied only with 10-round magazines, as per the 1995 Firearms Act.

According to the Operators Manual, there are few differences between the civilian Mark 23 and the government MK 23. These differences are the slide engraving "Mark 23" which is only for the first half of the first year of production in 1996 (KG date code), the roll-mark "MARK 23" which is for mid 1996 to now, these instead of "MK23 USSOCOM", Matte vs shiny finish for different civilian years, tan vs black frame (500 tan ones were made),  and a barrel conforming to SAAMI headspace specifications for the military vs civilian made, as the military barrels were made to allow ball ammunition to work more reliably.

Alternatives
In spite of its positive points, the MK 23's large size and weight have resulted in some criticism. The handgun was designed for offense rather than defense, the size and weight intentionally incorporated to help absorb recoil forces and retain greater accuracy; but this also decreased its ease of use, comfort, and draw speed in defensive situations which require a more conventional, compact pistol.

In response, HK developed the USP Tactical pistol based on the original USP. The USP Tactical and MK 23 look similar, although they are different pistols by design and purpose, the Tactical retains much of the performance of the MK 23 without the bulky size. It uses a different suppressor (due to 16 x 1mm left handed threading, as opposed to 16 x 1mm right-handed on the MK 23). An even more compact pistol than the USP Tactical for counter-terrorist and special forces use is the HK USP Compact Tactical, which has its own optional LAM. The USP-CT is lighter and is capable of fitting a suppressor, making it a prime choice for Special Forces on covert operations. Recently, HK has developed the HK 45, a much more contoured pistol based on the P2000, P8 and P30 models.

In popular culture
The Mk.23 SOCOM is famously known for being used by Solid Snake in Metal Gear Solid.

Users

: Used by the Peel Regional Police
: Komando Pasukan Katak (Kopaska) tactical diver group and Komando Pasukan Khusus (Kopassus) special forces group.
: MK 23 MOD 0 adopted by Pasukan Gerakan Khas Counter-terrorism Police Squad of the Royal Malaysia Police and Pasukan Khas Laut Maritime Counter-terrorism group of the Royal Malaysian Navy.
: Used by GROM.
: Used by the SOF, SOTF and the Special Warfare Group of the RSN
: Adopted by the U.S. SOCOM. Deliveries commenced in 1996.

See also
 Heckler & Koch USP, pistol based on the MK 23
 Heckler & Koch, the manufacturer
 List of individual weapons of the U.S. Armed Forces
 MEU(SOC) pistol—the Marine equivalent

References

Further reading 
Jane's Guns Recognition Guide by Ian V. Hogg

External links

Mark 23 Official website
Mark 23 Operator's Manual
MK 23 Video

.45 ACP semi-automatic pistols
MK23
Silenced firearms
Post–Cold War weapons of Germany
Police weapons
Short recoil firearms
Weapons and ammunition introduced in 1996